Geraldine Burton Branch (October 20, 1908 – July 22, 2016) was an American obstetrician-gynecologist who practiced in New York City, NY and Los Angeles, CA. She received her B.S. from Hunter College in chemistry and physics in 1932 and her M.D. from New York Medical College in 1936. In 1962, she received a master's degree in public health from the University of California, Los Angeles. The "Dr. Geraldine Burton-Branch Award" at Charles S. Drew University of Medicine and Science is a merit-based scholarship named in her honor.

In 1992, Branch received the Healing Hands Award from University of California, Santa Barbara

Early life and career 
Branch was born on October 20, 1908. She was the daughter of Joseph Burton and Agusta Freeman. She married Robert Henry and had two children.

Works and achievements 
Branch wrote several works regarding various health conditions such as "Study of Gonorrhea in Infants & Children"  and "Study of Use of Neighborhood Aides in Control of a Diphtheria Outbreak"

References

1908 births
2016 deaths
American centenarians
American gynecologists
American obstetricians
Hunter College alumni
New York Medical College alumni
Women centenarians